Gayatri Asokan is a playback singer who works mainly in Malayalam cinema. She started her playback career with the song "Deena Dayalo Rama" for the film Arayannagalude Veedu for music director Raveendran. "Enthe Nee Kanna" for Sasneham Sumitra won her the Kerala State Film Award for Best Singer in 2003.  Her other songs include "Chanjadi Adi" from Makalkku, "Thumbikkinnaram" from Naran and "Pularumo" from Ritu.

Career

Gayatri was first trained in Carnatic music by Sri Mangat Natesan and Sri Vamanan Namboodiri at Trichur. Later she started training in Hindustani music under Dr. Alka Deo Marulkar in Pune and later under Pandit Vinayaka Torvi in Bangalore.

She is also a Hindustani classical music singer, a Bhajan singer and has given Hindustani concerts and programs based on film songs abroad. She has sung 500 movie songs and has also sung and given music for a new album for the Art of Living foundation which was released in September 2006 by HMV worldwide. She recently sang for an album by Ilayaraja, Thiruvasagam, which was released by Sony Music.

Since 2017, Gayatri withdrew from film music industry and started focussing on gazals.

Other activities

Asokan is a jury member for the hit reality show Super Star Global on Amrita TV. She is now anchoring popular gazal show Khayal on Media One TV. In 2019, she performed in Jashn-e-Rekhta, a three-day annual Urdu festival and in Urdu Heritage Festival, Delhi. (( Top Singer Season 2))((2022 Present))

Personal life

Asokan is the daughter of Dr. P. U. Asokan and Dr. K. S. Sunidhy. Gayathri was married to Dr.Sayij on 4 January 2005, but the couple later divorced. She is married to Sitar player Purbayan Chatterjee.

Film songs (partial)

2000

2001

2002

2003

2004

2005

2006

2007

2008

2009

2010

2011

2015

Albums 

 Anahata- Art of Living
 Neeyum Nilavum- Manorama Music
 Thiruvasagam -Sony Music
 Vishudhi- Art of Living
 Sarveshwari- Art of Living
 Iniyennum _ East Coast
 Pranayathhin Ormakal
 Ghazals by Unnatural
 Palanivel

 Smaran – Art of Living
 Sankirtan – Art of Living
 Chants for workplaces – Kedar Pandit

Awards 

Kerala State Film Award for Best Singer (2003) – Enthe Nee Kanna – Sasneham Sumitra
2007 :Art of Living award for Outstanding Women Achievers
2011 :Asianet Television Awards for best playback singer -Harichandanam
2012 :Asianet Television Awards for best playback singer -Agniputhri

References

External links
www.gayatriasokan.com

A Devoted singer: Webpage 
Gayatri to perform in Raveendran Night at Swaralaya-2006

Gayatri-M-Pod Interview
The Hindu Interview

Living people
Singers from Thrissur
Indian women playback singers
Film musicians from Kerala
Malayalam playback singers
Hindustani singers
Indian women classical singers
Indian women composers
21st-century Indian composers
Women Hindustani musicians
Women musicians from Kerala
21st-century Indian women singers
21st-century Indian singers
21st-century women composers
Year of birth missing (living people)